Md. Sohrab is a Congress politician, five-time MLA and Congress legislature party leader in the West Bengal state assembly.

Personal life
Md. Sohrab, son of Yar Mohammad, is a post-graduate and is a retired head-teacher.

Political career
He was elected to the West Bengal state assembly from Suti (Vidhan Sabha constituency) in 1969, 1971, 1977 and 1996, as a Congress candidate.

When he was not given a party ticket to contest in 2001, he filed his nomination in the same constituency as a rebel candidate and lost. At that Adhir Ranjan Chowdhury, who has a reputation for  sponsoring rebels, commented, "Do you expect my former mastermoshai Md Sohrab (rebel candidate from Suti) and five-time MLA Habibur Rahman (rebel candidate from Jangipur) to listen to me?"
 
In 2011, he won from Jangipur (Vidhan Sabha constituency) and was Congress legislature party leader. He joined All India Trinamool Congress in 2016.

References 

Living people
West Bengal MLAs 1969–1971
West Bengal MLAs 1971–1972
West Bengal MLAs 1977–1982
West Bengal MLAs 1996–2001
West Bengal MLAs 2011–2016
People from Murshidabad district
Indian National Congress politicians
1933 births
Trinamool Congress politicians from West Bengal
20th-century Bengalis
21st-century Bengalis